Ioba is a genus of cicadas with an afrotropical distribution.

Species
These six species belong to the genus Ioba:
 Ioba bequaerti Distant, 1913 c g
 Ioba horizontalis (Karsch, 1890) c g
 Ioba leopardina (Distant, 1881) c g
 Ioba limbaticollis (Stal, 1863) c g
 Ioba stormsi (Distant, 1893) c g
 Ioba veligera (Jacobi, 1904) c g
Data sources: i = ITIS, c = Catalogue of Life, g = GBIF, b = Bugguide.net

References

Taxa named by William Lucas Distant
Cicadidae genera
Platypleurini